Charles Bradley (1789–1871) was an English Anglican priest who was eminent as a preacher and writer of sermons published between 1818 and 1853.

Early life
Bradley belonged to the evangelical school of the Church of England. He was born at Halstead, Essex, in February 1789. His parents, Thomas and Ann Bradley, were both of Yorkshire origin, but settled in Wallingford, where their son Charles, the elder of two sons, passed the greater part of the first twenty-five years of his life. He married, in 1810, Catherine Shepherd of Yattenden, took pupils and edited several school books, one or two of which are still in use. He was, for a time after his marriage, a member of St Edmund Hall, Oxford, but was ordained on reaching the age of 23, without proceeding to a degree, and in 1812 became curate of High Wycombe. Here for many years he combined the work of a private tutor with the sole charge of a large parish. Among his pupils were the late Mr. William Smith O'Brien, the leader for a short time of the so-called national party in Ireland; Mr. Bonamy Price, professor of political economy in the university of Oxford; and Archdeacon Jacob, well known for more than half a century in the diocese and city of Winchester. His powers as a preacher soon attracted attention. He formed the acquaintance of William Wilberforce, Thomas Scott, the commentator, Daniel Wilson, and others; and a volume of sermons, published in 1818 with a singularly felicitous dedication to Lord Liverpool, followed by a second edition in 1820, had a wide circulation. The sixth edition was published in 1824, the eleventh in 1854.

Career as a preacher
In the year 1825 he was presented by Henry Ryder (then bishop of St. Davids, afterwards of Lichfield) to the vicarage of Glasbury in Brecknockshire. Here a volume of sermons was published in 1825, which reached a ninth edition in 1854. He retained the living of Glasbury till his death, but in the year 1829 became the first incumbent of St. James's Chapel at Clapham in Surrey (now in Greater London), where he resided, with some periods of absence, till 1852.
By this time his reputation as a preacher was fully established. His striking face and figure and dignified and impressive delivery added to the effect produced by the substance and style of his sermons, which were prepared and written with unusual care and thought. A volume of sermons published in 1831, followed by two volumes of ‘Practical Sermons’ in 1836 and 1838, by ‘Sacramental Sermons’ in 1842, and ‘Sermons on the Christian Life’ in 1853, had for many years an exceedingly large circulation, and were widely preached in other pulpits than his own, not only in England and Wales, but in Scotland and America. Of late years their sale greatly declined, but the interest taken in them has revived, and a volume of selections was published in 1884.
Quite apart from the character of their contents, as enforcing the practical and speculative side of Christianity from the point of view of the earlier leaders of the evangelical party in the church of England, the literary merits of Bradley's sermons will probably give them a lasting place in literature of the kind. No one can read them without being struck by their singular simplicity and force, and at the same time by the sustained dignity and purity of the language.

Personal life
Bradley was the father of a numerous family. By his first wife, who died in 1831, he had thirteen children, of whom twelve survived him. The eldest of six sons was the Rev. C. Bradley of Southgate, well known in educational circles. The 4th, George Granville Bradley, was dean of Westminster 1881 to 1902, having been previously master of University College, Oxford, and headmaster of Marlborough College. By his second marriage in 1840 with Emma, daughter of Mr. John Linton, he also left a large family, one of whom, F. H. Bradley, fellow of Merton College, Oxford, was the most famous of the British Idealist philosophers, writing on ethics and logic. His youngest son, Andrew Cecil Bradley, who was best known for his writings on Shakespeare, was fellow of Balliol, and professor of English literature at Liverpool.

Bradley spent the last period of his life at Cheltenham, where he died in August 1871, aged 82.

References

 

1789 births
1871 deaths
19th-century English Anglican priests
People from Halstead